The 1963–64 Athenian League season was the 41st in the history of Athenian League. The league consisted of 43 teams.

Premier Division

The division featured 14 teams:
 12 came from last seasons Athenian League
 2 came from last seasons  Corinthian League:
 Dagenham (4.)
 Maidenhead United (7.)

League table

Division One

The division featured 14 teams, all teams came from last seasons Corinthian League

League table

Division Two

The division featured 15 teams, all teams came from last seasons Delphian League

League table

References

1963–64 in English football leagues
Athenian League